Saint Mary of the Snows Church, Reșița is the first Catholic church of Reșița, Romania. Situated in the old part of the city, it is flanked by the steel works and is closed in by a bridge-tunnel that helps intersection of the public road with industrial activities ways of the steel works. This is typical scenery in most parts of Reșița. The church is dedicated to Mary of the Snows, and simply known by some locals as Mary of the Snow. The present church replaced the original wood church that existed on the same spot.

History 
When the area belonged to the Kingdom of Hungary, the church was erected between 1846 and 1853, and sanctified in 1846. The wood church that existed on the same spot was erected in 1771. The church existed before the steelworks from behind of it and the bridge-tunnel from the front was constructed after 1947.

In a 1948 census there were 10,000 Catholics and 15,000 Orthodox believers in town.

The dedication of the church to Mary of the Snow is celebrated each year on the Sunday closest to 5 August.

The inside paintings were made by an unknown artist and were remade by Kurta Cazimir and Aurel Regulsky in 1988.

The organ was made by Richard Wegenstein from Timișoara in 1929 (L. Wegenstein and Sons company). It has a pneumatic structure, two guides, a crank and 18 sounding registers. The last restoration of it occurred in 2010.

Life of the church 

Masses are celebrated in three languages: Romanian, Hungarian and German (some prayers in Croatian or Czech on special occasions). Religious education is also in the three main ethno-historical languages of the city.

The parish, having the building next to the church, works closely with the Society of Saint Vincent de Paul, the society being relatively closely situated to the church. The Catholic Medical Association also shares many activities with Mary of Snow.

Each year in January, Mary of Snow, together with all Christians of the city actively participate in the Week of Prayer for Christian Unity.

There is also a local Ecumenical Women's Monthly Committee which meets for prayers in different churches of the city.

List of Catholic priests of Reșița 
The following table is a list of all catholic priest that served in Reșița.

References

External links
Official website  

Reșița
Historic monuments in Caraș-Severin County
Roman Catholic churches completed in 1853
19th-century Roman Catholic church buildings in Romania